The 2005 British Superbike season started on 26 March and ended on 9 October. It included 55 riders on 25 teams from 8 countries.# Riders used machines from 5 different constructors, including Honda, Ducati, Kawasaki, Suzuki and Yamaha.

Calendar

Entry List

Final championship standings (top 10)

Final Constructors Standings

Final Supersport championship standings (top 10)

References

External links
 BSB Website

British
British Superbike Championship
Superbike